Sayajigunj is one of the 182 Legislative Assembly constituencies of Gujarat state in India. It is part of Vadodara district.

List of segments
This assembly seat represents the following segments,

 Vadodara Taluka (Part) – Vadodara Municipal Corporation (Part) Ward No. – 7, 10, Undera (OG) 11, Karodiya (OG) 12.

Member of Legislative Assembly
2002 - Jitendra Sukhadiya, Bharatiya Janata Party
2007 - Jitendra Sukhadiya, Bharatiya Janata Party
2012 - Jitendra Sukhadiya, Bharatiya Janata Party

Election results

2022

2017

2012

2007

2002

See also
 List of constituencies of the Gujarat Legislative Assembly
 Vadodara district

References

External links
 

Assembly constituencies of Gujarat
Vadodara district